Vendoire is a commune in the Dordogne department in Nouvelle-Aquitaine in southwestern France.

Geography
The Lizonne forms the commune's northern and western borders.

Population

See also
Communes of the Dordogne department

References

Communes of Dordogne